Neochera is a genus of moths in the family Erebidae described by Jacob Hübner in 1819.

Species
 Neochera dominia Cramer, 1780
 Neochera inops Walker, 1854
 Neochera marmorea (Walker, 1856)
 Neochera privata Walker, 1862

References

Aganainae
Moth genera